Caytonanthus is an extinct genus of seed ferns.

Description 
Caytonanthus is the polliniferous organ-genus of the Caytoniales, and it is often found along Sagenopteris and Caytonia.
Caytonanthus remains have been found in Greenland, UK, Hungary Russia, Poland, India, Antarctica and Argentina. 
Caytonanthus has simple or multiple orders of branches arrayed along axes, each terminal branch bears one or many synangia, each composed by four, partially fused, pollen sacs.

References

Pteridospermatophyta
Triassic plants
Jurassic plants
Cretaceous plants
Prehistoric plant genera
Triassic first appearances
Cretaceous extinctions